William Smith (28 July 1873 – 1914) was a Scottish footballer who played in the Football League for Newcastle United.

References

1873 births
1914 deaths
Scottish footballers
English Football League players
Association football forwards
Hibernian F.C. players
Newcastle United F.C. players
Swindon Town F.C. players